Hewson Glacier is a glacier in the Queen Alexandra Range, Antarctica,  long, flowing northeast to enter Beardmore Glacier just north of The Cloudmaker. It was named by the New Zealand Geological Survey Antarctic Expedition (1961–62) for Ronald Hewson, a surveyor with the expedition.

See also
Morrison Hills, a series of rugged east–west trending hills between Garrard Glacier and Hewson Glacier

References

External links

Glaciers of Shackleton Coast